Naupa Huen is a village and municipality in Río Negro Province in Argentina.

References

Populated places in Río Negro Province